Robbert de Vos (born 26 May 1996) is a Dutch professional footballer who plays as a midfielder for Derde Divisie club BVV Barendrecht.

Professional career
De Vos played in his youth in VV Spijkenisse, Feyenoord and FC Groningen. He transferred to FC Emmen in 2018. De Vos made his professional debut for Emmen in a 6–0 Eredivisie loss to PSV Eindhoven on 20 October 2018, coming in as a substitute in the 71st minute for Henk Bos.

On 18 July 2022, De Vos joined Derde Divisie club BVV Barendrecht.

International career
De Vos made one appearance for the Netherland U16s in 2012.

References

External links
 

1996 births
Living people
People from Spijkenisse
Dutch footballers
Netherlands youth international footballers
FC Groningen players
FC Emmen players
Eredivisie players
Derde Divisie players
Association football midfielders
VV Spijkenisse players
Footballers from South Holland